The British Judo Council (BJC) is a membership organisation and a governing body for Judo in the United Kingdom.

History

In 1955 Kenshiro Abbe, then a 7th dan Japanese judoka and the highest ranked judoka outside Japan, was invited to Britain on a two year contract to teach Judo at the London Judo Society, a Judo School in South London. Abbe parted ways with the LJS in the following year and started his own school for Judo. He then in 1958 formed the British Judo Council, assisted by William (Bill) Wood his senior student, then a 3rd dan.  The British Judo Council subsequently amalgamated with the MOSJ an organisation founded by Masutaro Otani, another high ranking Japanese judoka.   

Membership of the BJC grew rapidly through to the early 1960s. Abbe served as president until 1964 when he returned to Japan. Masutaro Otani, in turn, served as BJC president until his death in 1977. The presidency was then filled by Masutaro's son, Robin Otani, who serves as president to the present day.

The BJC was affiliated to the British Judo Association (BJA) in 1994.

Philosophy

The BJC have a more traditional outlook towards Judo than is generally the case in Britain. The traditional white judogi is preferred over the more recent blue judogi that was introduced for international competition. Etiquette is more rigidly adhered to than is often the case in more sport-oriented clubs and organisations. The BJC stress the importance of kata, a view that is not shared by some other large organisational bodies in the UK.

See also
 Judo in the United Kingdom

Notes

Bibliography

Sports organizations established in 1958
Judo organizations
Judo in the United Kingdom